Velezzo Lomellina is a comune (municipality) in the Province of Pavia in the Italian region Lombardy, located about 50 km southwest of Milan and about 35 km west of Pavia. As of 31 December 2004, it had a population of 113 and an area of 8.6 km².

The municipality of Velezzo Lomellina contains the frazione (subdivision) Campalestro.

Velezzo Lomellina borders the following municipalities: Cergnago, Lomello, Olevano di Lomellina, San Giorgio di Lomellina, Semiana, Valle Lomellina, Zeme.

Demographic evolution

References

Cities and towns in Lombardy